The Whole Truth is a 1955 thriller play by the British writer Philip Mackie.

Originally written and broadcast by the BBC as a television play, it was rewritten for the stage the same year. It premiered at the Royal Lyceum Theatre in Edinburgh, before beginning a 145 performance West End run at the Aldwych Theatre. The original cast included Leslie Phillips, Ernest Clark and Sarah Lawson.

Film adaptation
In 1958 it was made into a film The Whole Truth directed by John Guillermin starring Stewart Granger and Donna Reed and George Sanders.

References

Bibliography
 Goble, Alan. The Complete Index to Literary Sources in Film. Walter de Gruyter, 1999.
 Wearing, J.P. The London Stage 1950-1959: A Calendar of Productions, Performers, and Personnel.  Rowman & Littlefield, 2014.

1955 plays
British plays adapted into films
West End plays